Lineopalpa horsfieldi is a species of moth of the family Erebidae first described by Achille Guenée in 1852. It is found in the Himalayas, Sumatra, Java, Borneo, Luzon, Sulawesi, Seram and New Guinea.

Adults are highly variable dark greenish brown with a forewing shape and fasciation that is typical for its family.

Subspecies
Lineopalpa horsfieldi horsfieldi (New Guinea)
Lineopalpa horsfieldi chlora Prout, 1922 (Himalayas, Sumatra, Java, Borneo, Luzon, Sulawesi, Seram)

References

Moths described in 1852
Calpinae